Itzig is a town in the commune of Hesperange, in southern Luxembourg.  , the town has a population of 2,005.

Hesperange
Towns in Luxembourg